Angst is a 1928 German-British silent drama film directed by Hans Steinhoff and starring Gustav Fröhlich, Henry Edwards and Elga Brink. It is based on the 1925 novella Fear by Stefan Zweig. The film was a co-production between Germany and Britain, with the British star Edwards included to give the work greater commercial appeal in the British Isles.

Cast
 Gustav Fröhlich
 Henry Edwards - Henry Duhan
 Elga Brink - Inge Duhan
 Bruno Kastner - Herr Born
 Margit Manstad -   Frau Claire
 Vivian Gibson
 Valerie Boothby
 Inge Landgut

Plot
Inge Duhan (Brink), a wealthy wife, begins conducting an affair, only to find herself blackmailed by another woman.

See also
La Peur (1936)
Fear (1954)

References

Bibliography

External links

1928 films
Films of the Weimar Republic
German silent feature films
German drama films
British silent feature films
British drama films
Films directed by Hans Steinhoff
Films based on short fiction
Films based on works by Stefan Zweig
German black-and-white films
British black-and-white films
1920s British films
Silent drama films
1920s German films